Caragana is a genus of about 80–100 species of flowering plants in the family Fabaceae, native to Asia and eastern Europe.

They have even-pinnate leaves with small leaflets, and solitary or clustered mostly yellow (rarely white or pink) flowers and bearing seeds in a linear pod.

Caragana species are used as food plants by the larvae of some Lepidoptera species including dark dagger.

Sections and species

Section Bracteolatae

Caragana ambigua Stocks
Caragana bicolor Kom.
Caragana brevispina Royle ex Benth.
Caragana conferta Benth. ex Baker
Caragana franchetiana Kom.
Caragana gerardiana Royle ex Benth.
Caragana jubata (Pall.) Poir.
Caragana sukiensis C.K.Schneid.
Caragana tibetica (Maxim. ex C.K. Schneid.) Kom.

Section Caragana

Caragana arborescens Lam.
Caragana boisii C.K.Schneid.
Caragana bungei Ledeb.
Caragana korshinskii Kom.
Caragana microphylla Lam.
Caragana pekinensis Kom.
Caragana prainii C.K.Schneid.
Caragana purdomii Rehder
Caragana soongorica Grubov
Caragana stipitata Kom.
Caragana turkestanica Kom.
Caragana zahlbruckneri C.K.Schneid.

Section Frutescentes

Caragana aurantiaca Koehne
Caragana brevifolia Kom.
Caragana chinghaiensis Y.X. Liou
Caragana camilli-schneideri Kom.
Caragana frutex (L.) K.Koch
Caragana gobica Sanchir
Caragana kirghisorum Pojark.
Caragana laeta Kom.
Caragana leucophloea Pojark.
Caragana opulens Kom.
Caragana polourensis Franch.
Caragana pygmaea (L.) DC.
Caragana rosea Turcz. ex Kom.
Caragana sinica (Buc'hoz) Rehder
Caragana stenophylla Pojark.
Caragana tangutica Maxim. ex Kom.
Caragana ussuriensis (Regel) Pojark.
Caragana versicolor Benth.

Unnamed section

Caragana bongardiana (Fisch. & C.A. Mey.) Pojark.
Caragana changduensis Y.X. Liou
Caragana pleiophylla (Regel) Pojark.
Caragana roborovskyi Kom.
Caragana tragacanthoides (Pall.) Poir.

Basal species

Caragana acanthophylla Kom.
Caragana dasyphylla Pojark.
Caragana hololeuca Bunge ex Kom.
Caragana spinosa (L.) Vahl ex Hornem.

Incertae sedis

Caragana afghanica Kitam.

Caragana alaica Pojark.
Caragana alaschanica Grubov
Caragana alexeenkoi Kamelin
Caragana alpina Y.X. Liou

Caragana arcuata Y.X. Liou

Caragana balchaschensis (Kom.) Pojark.
Caragana beefensis S.N. Biswas

Caragana brachypoda Pojark.
Caragana buriatica Peschkova
Caragana campanulata Vassilcz.

Caragana cinerea (Kom.) N.S. Pavlova

Caragana crassipina C. Marquand

Caragana cuneato-alata Y.X. Liou

Caragana decorticans Hemsl.
Caragana densa Kom.

Caragana erinacea Kom.

Caragana fruticosa (Pall.) Besser
Caragana grandiflora (M. Bieb.) DC.

Caragana kansuensis Pojark.

Caragana kozlowii Kom.

Caragana leucospina Kom.
Caragana leveillei Kom.

Caragana limprichtii Harms
Caragana litwinowii Kom.

Caragana maimanensis Rech. f.
Caragana manshurica (Kom.) Kom.

Caragana polyacantha Royle

Caragana × prestoniae R.J. Moore

Caragana scythica (Kom.) Pojark.
Caragana shensiensis C.W. Chang

Caragana × sophorifolia Tausch
Caragana spinifera Kom.

Caragana turfanensis (Krasn.) Kom.
Caragana ulicina Stocks

Range maps

References

External links
Flora of Pakistan: Caragana
Merriam-Webster Unabridged - Caragana entry

Hedysareae
Fabaceae genera